Rowen's Arcade is a shopping centre in the coastal town of Ulladulla in the South Coast of New South Wales.

Transport 
Rowens Arcade has coach connections to Eden and Nowra and bus connections to Bomaderry, Burrill Lake, Kioloa and Milton, as well as the local surrounding area. It is served by Premier Shoalhaven and Buslines Group.

History 
After Alf and Doreen Rowen spent many weekends in the Milton-Ulladulla area during the late 1940s and early 1950s, spear fishing and water skiing. They got first weekend house built in Kings Point by Millard and Ingold builders.

After liking the area so much, they bought a house on Princes Highway in Ulladulla originally owned by Mrs. Clancy, the wife of Mr. Clancy a publican of the Marlin Hotel, who was now deceased. They decided on that house as it had a large front yard that could be developed.

When Alf told his skiing friends they purchased that house, they said that they should have bought a house in a back street as Princes Highway is the main road through town and that it would be too noisy. When he told his friends he would build shops there, they thought he was crazy and so did many locals. 

In 1965 the Rowen's built a shopping arcade known as The Arcade containing 5 shops with Millard and Ingold builders building the arcade. The Arcade opened in time for Christmas 1965. The original businesses in The Arcade included Ryan & Banner Butchery, Eileen Cambage Bakery, Bob Horne Electrical, Dulcie Weeks Delicatessen and Betty Mison Hairdresser.

After wondering how to utilise the roof area and a holiday in Queensland in which Alf saw children riding on mini cars and that gave him an idea for a fun parlour above five shops. The original Funland amusement was built on top of the five shops by G Kearns & Son in 1970 and was fitted out by Alf. 

Funland opened in December 1970 and featured four trampolines, dodgem car with mini cars purchased from Italy, five 5c pinball machines and a pool table. The amusement parlour was only on weekends and school holidays. They also operated pedal boats in the harbour during the Christmas holiday periods. 

In 1976 after the youngest son finished year 12, the original house was removed and The Arcade was extended. This extension added eight shops, designed by Alan Foreman, a draftsman with builders G Kearns & Son. The Arcade then occupied half of the block from the Princes Highway towards Boree Street.

In 1980, three more shops were added and The Arcade was renamed to Rowen's Arcade. Funland was expanded in 1983 to its present size and provided a range of attractions unequalled on the South Coast, including full size adult rides like the Sizzler, dodgems, hundreds of arcade games and other novelty attractions.

In 1990 plans for the twin cinema and extra shops fronting Boree Street began. The cinema was designed to the requirements of John and Sue Kasoulis who then operated the Milton Cinema in nearby Milton. Construction of the cinema complex commenced in May 1992 by Steve Watt Constructions and was completed mostly by local tradesmen. The cinema was known Milton Theatre before being renamed as Arcadia Twin Cinemas. Subsequently Rowen's Arcade underwent a major internal refurbishment with the arcade being completely retiled and repainted.

The northern exit was replaced with a ramp in 1996. The adjacent vacant in the neighbouring land between Rowen’s Arcade and the Boree Street car park was purchased for use as a car park with a future development in mind.

In 2006 external changes were made to the finish of the large northern wall to blend it with the Arcadia Twin Cinemas wall and in 2011 minor internal and external refurbishment was completed.

In 2015 an elevator lift to the cinema and Funland was added replacing a previous Wheelchair stair lift. During that year in November, Funland was sold by Rowen family to Funland Australia.

On 1 April 2016 after 50 years of trading under the Rowen family’s ownership, Rowen's Arcade was sold to new owners for $9.3 million after first being put up for sale on 18 June 2013.

Tenants 
Rowen's Arcade has 4,417m² of floor space. The major retailers include Funland and Arcadia Twin Cinemas.

References

External links 
Rowen's Arcade Official Website

Shopping centres in New South Wales
Shopping malls established in 1965
1965 establishments in Australia